Leonie Eileen Pihama (born 1962) is a New Zealand Kaupapa Māori academic.

Career 
Pihama was born in 1962. She wrote her 1993 master's thesis at the University of Auckland with the title Tungia te ururua, kia tupu whakaritorito te tupu o te harakeke : a critical analysis of parents as first teachers. She completed her PhD at the same institution in 2001 and her doctoral thesis had the title Tīhei mauri ora : honouring our voices : mana wahine as a kaupapa Māori : theoretical framework. She won a Fulbright-Ngā Pae o te Māramatanga Scholar Award and is now a Ngā Pae o te Māramatanga principal investigator. She did a PhD at the University of Auckland and rose to Associate Professor there, before moving to the University of Waikato in Hamilton, New Zealand.

Pihama served on the establishment board of Māori TV and then as a director, but quit after three years due to a conflict of interest involving a family member.

In 2017,  Pihama was ranked as one of the '100 Māori leaders' by Te Rau Matatini.

Publications 
 Pihama, Leonie, Fiona Cram, and Sheila Walker. "Creating methodological space: A literature review of Kaupapa Maori research." Canadian Journal of Native Education 26, no. 1 (2002): 30.
 Pihama, Leonie, Kaapua Smith, Mereana Taki, and Jenny Lee. "A literature review on kaupapa Maori and Maori education pedagogy." Prepared for ITP New Zealand by The International Research Institute for Maori and Indigenous Education (IRI) (2004).
 Johnston, Patricia, and Leonie Pihama. "What counts as difference and what differences count: Gender, race and the politics of difference." Irwin K, Ramsden I. Toi Wähine: The Worlds of Mäori Women. Penguin Books, Auckland (1995).
 Pihama, Leonie. "Are films dangerous?: a Maori woman's perspective on 'The Piano'." Hecate 20, no. 2 (1994): 239.

Personal life
Pihama is of Te Ātiawa, Ngāti Māhanga and Ngā Māhanga ā Tairi descent.

References

External links
 linked-in
 institutional homepage
 twitter
 blog

New Zealand Māori academics
New Zealand Māori women academics
New Zealand women academics
Te Āti Awa people
University of Auckland alumni
Academic staff of the University of Auckland
Academic staff of the University of Waikato
Living people
1962 births